Ophonus libanigena is a species of ground beetle in the subfamily Harpalinae, genus Ophonus, and subgenus Ophonus (Hesperophonus).

References

libanigena
Beetles described in 1876